Luisa Sanfelice is a 2004 Italian historical film directed by Paolo and Vittorio Taviani. It stars Laetitia Casta and was co-produced between Italy and France. It is an adaptation of a book by Alexandre Dumas.

Plot
The film is about the life of Luisa Sanfelice, a young member of the Neapolitan nobility who is in love with a republican, Salvato Palmieri. In the wake of the French Revolution a Napoleonic army led by general Jean-Étienne Championnet enters in Naples. Horatio Nelson receives the duty to organise the exile of King Ferdinand to Palermo. After the court has fled the Parthenopean Republic is proclaimed in January 1799. Also Luisa's husband, Cavaliere Luciano Sanfelice, has gone, but she stays. Luisa becomes the symbol of the hatred  nobility though she supports the revolution. In June of the same year Naples is taken by the royalist troops conducted by cardinal Fabrizio Ruffo. Ferdinand returns to the town: with his well-known brutality he orders several massacres and the elimination of all opponents. 50000 Neapoletans are left dead. Disregarding the outrage of the population Ferdinand puts Luisa to death on 11 September 1800.

Cast

 Laetitia Casta as Luisa Sanfelice
 Adriano Giannini as Salvato Palmieri
 Cecilia Roth as Maria Carolina 
 Marie Baumer as Lady Emma Hamilton 
 Emilio Solfrizzi as King Ferdinand I
 Lello Arena as Pasquale De Simone
 Linda Batista as Eleonora de Fonseca Pimentel
 Mariano Rigillo as Cavaliere Luciano Sanfelice
 Carmelo Gómez as Cardinal Fabrizio Ruffo
 Jean-Yves Berteloot as Jean-Étienne Championnet
 Margarita Lozano as Marga
 Johannes Silberschneider as Horatio Nelson
 Yari Gugliucci as Michele
 Teresa Saponangelo as Assunta 
 José Ángel Egido as Dottore Cirillo

See also 
 List of Italian films of 2004

References

External links 
 

2004 films
2004 television films
Italian television films
French television films
2000s Italian-language films
2000s historical drama films
Films based on works by Alexandre Dumas
Films directed by Paolo and Vittorio Taviani
French historical drama films
Italian historical drama films
Films set in Naples
Films set in 1799
Films set in 1800
Cultural depictions of Emma, Lady Hamilton
Cultural depictions of Horatio Nelson
2004 drama films
Films scored by Nicola Piovani
Cultural depictions of Italian women
Television shows based on works by Alexandre Dumas
2000s Italian films
2000s French films